Lissocampus is a genus of pipefishes mostly native to the Indian Ocean.  One species (L. bannwarthi) is only known to occur in the Gulf of Aqaba and the Gulf of Suez and one species (L. filum) occurs in the Pacific Ocean around New Zealand and the Chatham Islands.  The remaining species are endemic to Australia.

Species
The currently recognized species in this genus are:
 Lissocampus bannwarthi (Duncker, 1915)
 Lissocampus caudalis Waite & Hale, 1921 (smooth pipefish)
 Lissocampus fatiloquus (Whitley, 1943) (prophet's pipefish)
 Lissocampus filum (Günther, 1870) (shortsnout pipefish)
 Lissocampus runa (Whitley, 1931) (javelin pipefish)

References

Syngnathidae
Marine fish genera
Taxa named by Edgar Ravenswood Waite